Indus Valley School of Art and Architecture is a not-for-profit degree awarding institution in Karachi, Sindh, Pakistan. The university was established in 1989, thereby empowering it to award its own degrees and was the fourth private institution of higher learning in Pakistan to be given a university status. As of 2008, IVS was the third highest ranking art and design university in Pakistan.

The degrees offered include a 5-year degree program in Architecture and 4 year degree programs in Interior Design, Textile and Communication Design, and Fine Arts. The core degree courses are supported throughout the curriculum with liberal arts courses as well. In 2020, IVS commenced its first graduate programme, M.Phil. in Art and Design. It is a two year degree focusing on nurturing critical and creative practice.

IVS was founded by 
 Arshad Abdulla - Architect
 Haamid N. Jaffer - Businessman
 Imran Mir - Artist and Designer 
 Inayat Ismail - Chartered Accountant
 Nighat Mir - Designer
 Noorjehan Bilgrami - Artist, Designer, Researcher
 Shahid Abdulla - Architect
 Shahid Sajjad - Artist, notable sculptor.
 Shehnaz Ismail - Textile Designer, Educator, President's Pride of Performance Award
 Syed Akeel Bilgrami - Architect, Educator.

The founders felt and believed that such a school was critically needed in Karachi.

Programs 
 Architecture
 Interior Design
 Communication Design
 Textile Design
 Fine Art and Design
 Liberal Arts
 Fashion Design
 Graduate Programme: M.Phil. in Art and Design

Alumni 
 Bilal Maqsood - Artist, singer, musician, songwriter, composer
 Sarwat Gilani - Actress and model
 Shamoon Sultan - Textile Designer - Owner and Founder of Khaadi 
 Omar Omari - Architect, Member Provincial Assembly (PTI)
 Huma Mulji - Highly acclaimed artist and educator
 Adeela Suleman - Internationally acclaimed sculptor with exhibitions that are scattered across the globe; had studied art at this institution.
 Ahmed Ansari - Assistant Professor at New York University at the Integrated Digital Media program 
Mojiz Hasan - Artist, actor, director, designer 
The I.V.S. Alumni Association was established in November 2001 and is supported by the school. The association periodically publishes a newsletter, organizes social events and keeps a close liaison with the school. The alumni office is located on the campus.

Computer laboratory
Agha Hasan Abedi is a Computer Laboratory for computer-generated design projects. This laboratory was newly refurbished in 2011.

Library
Marium Abdulla Library The establishment of the Marium Abdulla Library (MAL) coincided with the inception of the Indus Valley School of Art and Architecture in 1989.

Media 
The popular Pakistani Hum TV Television serial Zindagi Gulzar Hai was filmed at Indus Valley School of Art and Architecture.

See also 
 Farah Mahbub (photographer)

References

External links 
 
Indus Valley School of Art and Architecture on Pakistan Press Foundation website

Architecture schools in Pakistan
Art schools in Pakistan
Universities and colleges in Karachi
1989 establishments in Pakistan